The 1984 Boise State Broncos football team represented Boise State University in the 1984 NCAA Division I-AA football season. The Broncos competed in the Big Sky Conference and played their home games on campus at Bronco Stadium in Boise, Idaho. The Broncos were led by second–year head coach Lyle Setencich, Boise State finished the season 6–5 overall and 4–3 in conference.

Schedule

Roster

References

External links
 Bronco Football Stats – 1984

Boise State
Boise State Broncos football seasons
Boise State Broncos football